New Jersey's 26th Legislative District is one of 40 in the New Jersey Legislature. As of the 2011 apportionment, the district includes the Essex County communities of Fairfield Township, North Caldwell, Verona and West Caldwell; the Morris County municipalities of Butler, Jefferson Township, Kinnelon, Lincoln Park, Montville, Morris Plains, Parsippany-Troy Hills and Rockaway Township; along with the Passaic County community of West Milford.

Demographic characteristics
As of the 2020 United States census, the district had a population of 224,584, of whom 179,363 (79.9%) were of voting age. The racial makeup of the district was 159,789 (71.1%) White, 5,396 (2.4%) African American, 494 (0.2%) Native American, 33,908 (15.1%) Asian, 49 (0.0%) Pacific Islander, 7,733 (3.4%) from some other race, and 17,215 (7.7%) from two or more races. Hispanic or Latino of any race were 23,197 (10.3%) of the population. 

The 26th District had 178,510 registered voters as of December 1, 2021, of whom 65,311 (36.6%) were registered as unaffiliated, 61,674 (34.5%) were registered as Republicans, 49,748 (27.9%) were registered as Democrats, and 1,777 (1.0%) were registered to other parties.

The Asian population was above the state average, while there were relatively few African American and Hispanic residents in the district. The percentage of children receiving Temporary Assistance for Needy Families was the fourth lowest of any district and the percentage of the population age 65 and over was eighth highest. The district had one of the lowest percentages in the state of registered Democrats, with Republicans outnumbering Democrats by a more than 2–1 margin.

Political representation
For the 2022–2023 session, the district is represented in the State Senate by Joseph Pennacchio (R, Rockaway Township) and in the General Assembly by Christian Barranco (R, Jefferson Township) and Jay Webber (R, Morris Plains).

The legislative district is almost entirely located within New Jersey's 11th congressional district, with the exception of West Milford, which is in the 5th district.

District composition since 1973
The 26th District when it was created in 1973 along with the 40-district legislative map was based in the urban area around The Oranges, specifically West Orange, Orange, East Orange, and a small sliver of the North Ward of Newark. In the 1981 redistricting, the district moved out of Essex County and was routed along the eastern border of Morris County from Chatham Township to Kinnelon including Parsippany-Troy Hills and Morris Plains and northern Passaic County's West Milford and Ringwood. Following the 1991 redistricting, Chatham Township was removed but Madison and Mountain Lakes were added in Morris County; in Passaic County, however, West Milford and Ringwood were shifted to the 40th District, Bloomingdale and Pompton Lakes instead made up the Passaic portion of the district during this decade. West Caldwell, Caldwell, and Fairfield Township in Essex Count were now included within the district.

Changes to the district made in the 2001 legislative apportionment based on the results of the 2000 United States Census added Hanover Township (from the District 25) and West Milford Township (from District 40) and removed Madison Borough (to the District 21), Mountain Lakes (to District 25) and Fairfield Township and West Caldwell Township (to District 27). Changes to the district made as part of the 2011 apportionment include the addition of Fairfield Township (from District 27), Jefferson Township (from District 25), North Caldwell Borough (from District 27), Rockaway Township (from District 25), Verona Township (from District 40) and West Caldwell Township (from District 27). The 2011 apportionment removed Bloomingdale (to District 39), Chatham Borough (to District 21), East Hanover, Florham Park, and Hanover Township (to District 27), Pequannock Township, Pompton Lakes Borough, and Riverdale (to District 40),

In the 1977 Democratic primary for the Senate seat, incumbent Frank J. Dodd faced opposition from Assemblyman Eldridge Hawkins and tennis star Althea Gibson, who was serving as state Athletic Commissioner. Dodd was supported by the Essex County Democratic organization under County Chairman Harry Lerner. With Gibson and Hawkins splitting the anti-organization vote, Dodd won the nomination and the subsequent general election.

In 1983, Leanna Brown challenged her former running-mate, James P. Vreeland, for the Republican nomination for State Senate in the Republican primary in what the Philadelphia Daily News described as a "stunning upset" and was elected to the State Senate, becoming the first woman from the Republican Party to serve in the upper house of the State Legislature. In 1993, Brown resigned from the Senate after she was appointed to the New Jersey Casino Control Commission, initially to serve out the unexpired term of Charles J. Irwin. Assemblymember Robert Martin was chosen to fill Brown's vacancy in the Senate.

In December 1988 Governor of New Jersey Thomas Kean nominated Ralph A. Loveys to succeed Joseph A. Sullivan as the chairman of the New Jersey Turnpike Authority In January 1989, Alex DeCroce, a member of the Morris County Board of Chosen Freeholders, was named to fill Loveys' vacant seat in the General Assembly.

Carol J. Murphy was nominated in February 2001 to serve on the New Jersey Board of Public Utilities by Acting Governor of New Jersey Donald DiFrancesco.  In February 2001, a special convention of district Republicans chose Joseph Pennacchio to fill the General Assembly seat vacated by Murphy. Alex DeCroce died on January 9, 2012, after collapsing in a bathroom inside the Statehouse, just moments after the 214th Legislature held its final voting session. On January 25, 2012, his widow, BettyLou DeCroce, was selected by the Morris County Republican Committee to replace him in the Assembly until a November 2012 special election was held. She won the special election and subsequent general elections running with Jay Webber. On June 8th 2021, DeCroce lost her reelection bid to former Pompton Lakes councilman Christian Barranco.

Election history

Election results

Senate

General Assembly

References

Essex County, New Jersey
Morris County, New Jersey
Passaic County, New Jersey
26